Southern Leyte State University (Pamantasang Pamahalaan ng Southern Leyte) is a public university situated in Southern Leyte, Philippines.  It is mandated to provide advanced education, higher technological, professional instruction and training in trade, fishery, agriculture, forestry, science, education, commerce, engineering and related courses.  It is also mandated to undertake research and extension services, and provided progressive leadership in its areas of specialization. Formerly the Southern Leyte State College of Science and Technology and Tomas Oppus Normal College, SLSU was created through the passage of Republic Act 9261 on March 7, 2004.

Colleges and Institutes 

 College of Technology
 College of Engineering
 College of Computer Studies and Information Technology
 College of Teacher Education
 College of Aquatic and Applied Life Sciences
 College of Agriculture and Environmental Sciences
 College of Business and Management
 College of Criminal Justice
 College of Social Works and Development (proposed)
 Institute of Arts and Sciences

History

Sogod Campus (Main) 
 
On July 7, 1969, Sogod National Trade School was created by virtue of Republic Act No. 4352, a vocational institution in Sogod, tasked to answer the problem of lack of manpower training for adults and out of school youths. Twelve years after, the school once again was converted into Southern Leyte School of Arts and Trade, this time transforming it into an institution of tertiary education. Republic Act 7930 was enacted by the Congress of the Philippines on March 1, 1995, further converting the school into a chartered state College and renamed it Southern Leyte State College of Science and Technology (SLSCST). Republic Act 9261 which was enacted and approved by Congress and the Senate Republic of the Philippines on March 7, 2004, established the Southern Leyte State University by integrating the Southern Leyte State College of Science and Technology in the Municipality of Sogod and Tomas Oppus Normal College in the Municipality of Tomas Oppus. With this development, five higher education campuses were integrated to comprise the university since SLSCST has been made host to three other CHED-supervised institutions in October 1999.

Hinunangan Campus 

College of Agriculture and Environmental Sciences:
RA 5380 established the Hinunangan Agricultural and Vocational School on September 1, 1975.
RA 7931 converted the school into a tertiary institution and renamed to the Southern Leyte Institute of Agriculture and Technology
RA 9261 established the Southern Leyte State University - Hinunangan after its integration with SLSCST in 1999.

Tomas Oppus Campus 
College of Teacher Education:
Barrio Resolution No. 52, s. 1970 of Barrio San Isidro, Tomas Oppus, Southern Leyte established the Tomas Oppus Community College
P.D. 2024 converted the TOCC into a State College to be known as Tomas Oppus Normal College on February 1, 1986.
DECS Regional Office granted the school to offer a 4-yearcourse in AB and BSED programs in 1987
RA 9261 established the Southern Leyte State University through the integration of this college with SLSCST on March 7, 2004

Bontoc Campus 
College of Aquatic and Applied Life Sciences:
RA No. 3938 established the Bontoc Agricultural and Technical School on June 7, 1964, and three years later was renamed to Bontoc National Agricultural and Fishery School
BP Bilang 494 established the Southern Leyte Agro-Fishery Technical Institute which became a full-pledged tertiary institution on June 10, 1983
BP Bilang 888 renamed the school to Ruperto K. Kangleon Memorial Agro-Fisheries Technical Institute on November 22, 1985.
RA 9261 established the Southern Leyte State University- Bontoc after its integration with SLSCST in 1999

San Juan Campus 
College of Business and Management:
The San Juan Polytechnic College was formerly a Municipal High School established in 1946 and eighteen years later, it was converted into Cabalian National Vocational High School by Legislation.
In 1968, Congress changed the school into San Juan Comprehensive High School
By virtue of Batas Pambansa Blg. 569, the San Juan Polytechnic College was established on June 24, 1983.
RA 9261 established the Southern Leyte State University-San Juan after its integration with SLSCST in 1999.

Degrees offered

College of Engineering and Technology (CET) 
Department of Mechanical Engineering and Automotive Technology:
 BS in Mechanical Engineering
 BS in Industrial Technology major in Automotive Technology
 BS in Industrial Technology major in Refrigeration and Air-Conditioning

Department of Electrical Engineering and Electrical Technology:
 BS in Electrical Engineering
 BS in Industrial Technology major in Electrical Technology

Department of Civil Engineering and Drafting Technology:
 BS in Civil Engineering
 BS in Industrial Technology major in Architectural Drafting

Department of Computer Engineering and Electronics Technology:
 BS in Computer Engineering
 BS in Industrial Technology major in Electronics Technology

Department of Food Science and Technology:
 BS in Food Technology and Entrepreneurship
 BS in Industrial Technology major in Culinary Science

Department of Fashion Science and Apparel Technology (proposed):
 BS in Fashion Designing
 BS in Industrial Technology major in Fashion and Apparel Technology

College of Computer Studies and Information Technology (CCSIT) 
Department of Information Technology:
 BS in Information Technology major in Programming
 BS in Information Technology major in Networking
 BS in Information Technology major in GIS Technology (proposed)
 BS in Computer Science (proposed)

College of Criminal Justice (CCJ) 
Department of Criminal Justice Education:
 BS in Criminology

College of Teacher Education (CTE) 
Department of Secondary Teacher Education:
 Bachelor of Secondary Education major in Physical Sciences
 Bachelor of Secondary Education major in Biological Sciences
 Bachelor of Secondary Education major in Mathematics
 Bachelor of Secondary Education major in Social Sciences
 Bachelor of Secondary Education major in English
 Bachelor of Secondary Education major in Filipino
 Bachelor of Secondary Education major in MAPEH
 Diploma in Basic Education Teaching

Department of Elementary Teacher Education:
 Bachelor of Elementary major in General Education
 Bachelor of Elementary major in Special Education
 Bachelor of Elementary major in Pre-School Education

College of Business and Management (CBM) 
Department of Hospitality Management:
 BS in Hospitality Management
 BS in Eco-Tourism Management (to be proposed)

Department of Office and Business Administration:
 BS in Office Administration
 BS in Business Administration major in HRDM
 BS in Business Administration major in Marketing
 BS in Entrepreneurship

Additional programs in Accountancy, Public Administration and Technology Management

College of Aquatic and Applied Life Sciences (CAALS) 
Department of Marine Biological Sciences:
 BS in Marine Biology

Department of Fishery Science and Technology:
 BS in Fisheries and Aquatic Resources (existing curriculum will be revised)

Department of Agro-Biological Science (proposed):
 BS Biotechnology
 BS Bioinformatics

College of Agricultural and Environmental Sciences (CAES) 
Department of Agro-Biological Science:
 BS in Agricultural Technology (to be converted to BS in agriculture)

Department of Agri-business Management:
 BS in Agricultural Entrepreneurship

Institute of Arts and Sciences (IAS) 
Department of Arts, Languages and Communication (proposed)

Department of Natural Sciences and Mathematics (proposed)

Department of Social and Behavioral Sciences (proposed)

Graduate School (GS) 
Doctor of Philosophy - Technological Management
Doctor of Education -  Educational Management
Doctor in Public Administration
Master of Arts in Education
Master in Public Administration
Master of Arts in Teaching
Master in Management
Master in Technology Education
Master of Science in Information Technology

References

External links
Southern Leyte State University (Official Site)

State universities and colleges in the Philippines
Universities and colleges in Southern Leyte